Robert Bouchard is a Canadian politician, who was elected to the Legislative Assembly of the Northwest Territories in the 2011 election. He represented the electoral district of Hay River North from 2011 to 2015.

References 

Living people
Members of the Legislative Assembly of the Northwest Territories
Franco-Ténois people
People from Hay River
Year of birth missing (living people)